Gurunath Sengupta (1848–1914) was a Sanskrit scholar who was born in village  Benda, Narail in the old Jessore District of Bangladesh.  He was a noted writer, producing several volumes of poetry, discourses, commentaries and annotations on philosophy and religion, novels and collections of essays in both the Sanskrit and Bengali languages. He wrote ofjib-atta the human soul. He gave a foundation to the Hindu sect Satya Dharma.

Bengali Hindu saints
Founders of new religious movements
Jashore District
Bengali writers
1848 births
1914 deaths
University of Calcutta alumni